Import is the act of bringing goods into a country.

Import may also refer to:

import and export of data, in computing
import tariff, a tax on imported goods
import quota, a type of trade restriction
Import substitution industrialization, an economic policy
Import scene, a subculture that centers on modifying imported brand cars
The #Import directive in Objective-C
The import keyword in Java

See also
 Export (disambiguation)